Abish may refer to the following people:
Given name
Abish (Book of Mormon), a Lamanite woman who lived in the 1st century BC
Absh Khatun, the Queen of Persia from 1263 to 1287
Abish Kekilbayev (1939–2015), Kazakhstani politician
Abish Mathew, an Indian stand-up comedian and a YouTube performer

Surname
Cecile Abish (born 1930), American artist
Walter Abish (1931–2022), Austrian-American author of experimental novels and short stories

Masculine given names